James Paul Holmes (born 11 November 1953) is an Irish former professional footballer. Hailing from Meath Square in The Liberties, he won 30 full international caps for the Republic of Ireland, scoring once.

Career 
Holmes, a left-back, began his career with St. John Bosco. He joined Coventry City as apprentice and was a member of the FA Youth Cup Final side in 1970. He turned professional in November 1970 and became the Republic of Ireland's youngest ever full international at 17 years, 200 days when he came on as a 74th-minute substitute for Don Givens in the 4–1 defeat in the European Championship Qualifier against Austria at Dalymount Park on 30 May 1971.

He made his league debut later that year in the home game against Leicester City on 4 December and gradually established himself in the Coventry first team. In March 1977, after 8 goals in 143 games for Coventry, he moved to Tottenham Hotspur for a fee of £120,000. A broken leg ended his career at White Hart Lane after 92 games, in which he scored twice. While on international duty, Jimmy broke his leg and complications arose in the setting of the leg.

In February 1981, the Vancouver Whitecaps of the North American Soccer League purchased his contract for £100,000. However, he played only seventeen games over two seasons. During this time he made one final appearance in the Irish national side. In October 1982 he returned to the UK, joining Leicester City on a free transfer, but played only twice before a free transfer took him to Brentford in February 1983. A month later, another free transfer took him to Torquay United, Holmes playing 25 games (3 goals) for Bruce Rioch's side. In November 1983 he moved to Peterborough United, scoring 7 times in 60 games before ending his league career.

He enjoyed a testimonial match in 1985 at Dalymount Park, when an Irish XI beat a Glenn Hoddle XI.

He later became a police officer in the Midlands and currently works as a chauffeur. As a police officer, he was once called into duty again while on police duty at Coventry City's Highfield Road. When one of the players for a testimonial did not show, Jimmy stepped into the fray. In August 2007 he was formally commended for his bravery in July 2006.

References

External links
 Tottenham Hotspur: Jimmy Holmes
 NASL stats

1953 births
Brentford F.C. players
British police officers
Coventry City F.C. players
Expatriate footballers in England
Expatriate soccer players in Canada
Leicester City F.C. players
Living people
North American Soccer League (1968–1984) players
Association footballers from Dublin (city)
Peterborough United F.C. players
Republic of Ireland association footballers
Republic of Ireland expatriate association footballers
Republic of Ireland international footballers
Torquay United F.C. players
Tottenham Hotspur F.C. players
Vancouver Whitecaps (1974–1984) players
Irish expatriate sportspeople in Canada
Association football fullbacks
Nuneaton Borough F.C. players
Leicester United F.C. players
Hitchin Town F.C. players
Bedworth United F.C. players
Nuneaton Borough F.C. managers
Hitchin Town F.C. managers
Bedworth United F.C. managers
National League (English football) players
National League (English football) managers
Isthmian League players
Isthmian League managers
Southern Football League players
Southern Football League managers
Peterborough United F.C. non-playing staff
Republic of Ireland football managers